Change the Station is an album by English band A Certain Ratio, released under the acronym ACR in January 1997. Released on Rob's Records label, it was the band's first album after a five-year hiatus, since 1992's Up in Downsville.

The album finds the band working from a dance-pop and ambient music foundation, with elements from Madchester funk and ambient house. The record also features vocals from singers Denise Johnson and Lorna Bailey.

Critical reception

AllMusic senior critic Stephen Thomas Erlewine thought that the record "finds A Certain Ratio in top form." Erlewine also praised Johnson and Bailey's vocals, writing that their "soulful singing gives the songs dimension, helping make Change the Station a genuine return to form."

Track listing
 "Listen to the Sound" – 4:59
 "Some Day" – 6:15
 "Your on Your Own" – 4:54
 "Waiting for You" – 6:00
 "Yeah Boy" – 6:59
 "Sister Brother" – 5:11
 "Desire" – 6:05
 "Samba 123" – 5:27
 "Pole" – 5:47
 "Do Du Beep" – 6:07
 "Golden Balls" – 5:48
 "Funk Off" – 5:34
 "Groov(E)" – 5:01

Personnel
Album personnel as adapted from album liner notes.
 A Certain Ratio – performance, production, mixing; recording (2–5, 7–12)
 Denise Johnson – additional vocals (1, 6–7, 9, 11–12)
 Lorna Bailey – additional vocals (2–3)
 Liam Mullan – additional keyboards (3)
 Andy Connell – piano, Rhodes piano (6)
 Corinne Drewery – additional vocals (6)
 MCR Horns – brass instruments (11–12)
 Tim Oliver – audio engineering (1, 6, 13)
 Julia Fenton – CGI artist
 Andy Robinson – editing
 Graham Newman – typography

References

External links
 

1997 albums
A Certain Ratio albums
Dance-pop albums by English artists
Ambient albums by English artists